The second season of the American television musical drama series, Nashville, began on September 25, 2013 and concluded on May 14, 2014, on ABC. The series was renewed for a second season on May 10, 2013.

With the exceptions of "Tomorrow Never Comes" and "On the Other Hand", the episodes are named after songs by female country artists such as Patsy Cline, Emmylou Harris, and Kitty Wells.

Cast

Regular
 Connie Britton as Rayna Jaymes
 Hayden Panettiere as Juliette Barnes
 Clare Bowen as Scarlett O'Connor
 Chris Carmack as Will Lexington
 Eric Close as Teddy Conrad
 Charles Esten as Deacon Claybourne
 Jonathan Jackson as Avery Barkley
 Sam Palladio as Gunnar Scott
 Lennon Stella as Maddie Conrad
 Maisy Stella as Daphne Conrad

Recurring
 Chaley Rose as Zoey Dalton
 Ed Amatrudo as Glenn Goodman
 Judith Hoag as Tandy Hampton
 Aubrey Peeples as Layla Grant
 Oliver Hudson as Jeff Fordham
 Will Chase as Luke Wheeler
 Christina Chang as Megan Vannoy
David Alford as Bucky Dawes
Derek Krantz as Brent McKinney
 Kimberly Williams-Paisley as Peggy Kentor
 Charlie Bewley as Charles Wentworth
 Michiel Huisman as Liam McGuinnis
 Powers Boothe as Lamar Wyatt

Guest
 Dana Wheeler-Nicholson as Beverly O'Connor
 Charlotte Ross as Ruth Bennett
 Robert Wisdom as Coleman Carlisle
Suzanne Alexander as herself
 Conan O'Brien as himself
 Katie Cook as herself
 Robin Roberts as herself
 Kelly Clarkson as herself
 Zac Brown as himself
 Jay DeMarcus as himself
 Austin Dillon as himself
 Mario Lopez as himself
 Maria Menounos as herself
 Brad Paisley as himself
 Michelle Obama as herself
 Kellie Pickler as herself

Production
On May 10, 2013, Nashville was renewed for a second season by ABC. Season 2 began on September 25, 2013, at 10/9c. Chris Carmack, Lennon Stella, and Maisy Stella were promoted to series regulars, while Powers Boothe and Robert Wisdom were reduced to recurring status, in the second season. Aubrey Peeples and Chaley Rose joined the cast in major recurring roles as Layla Grant, a runner-up in a singing competition and a new singer in Nashville who is a new rival for Juliette, and Zoey, Scarlett's childhood best friend who moves to Nashville.

Episodes

U.S. ratings

References

External links

Season 2
2013 American television seasons
2014 American television seasons